The Ministry of Education and Culture is one of the twelve ministries in Finland. It prepares laws and oversees the administration of matters relating to education (such as daycare, schools and universities), and culture (such as  museums, libraries and arts), as well as sports and science.

The Ministry of Education and Culture is one of the oldest ministries in Finland. It was started as the Ecclesiastical Department in 1809, when the Grand Duchy of Finland was an autonomous part of the Russian Empire.

See also 
 Education in Finland

References 

Government of Finland
Education